Phytantriol is an aliphatic alcohol used in cosmetic products and as a food additive. At room temperature it is a viscous liquid that is colourless to light yellow and with a sweetish odour.

Preparation
Phytantriol is prepared by oxidizing isophytol in formic acid, hydrolysis of the product with an inorganic base, and isolation.

Uses
As a cosmetic ingredient, phytantriol functions to increase moisture retention in skin and hair and helps vitamins and amino acids penetrate. As of 2002 it is found in about 100 cosmetic products, such as hair conditioners, shampoos, and hair tonics, in concentrations from 0.0002% to 1%.

Phytantriol is an amphiphile that is the second most used in making cubosomes.

Toxicology
Oral  values were >5000 mg/kg in rats and mice.

See also
 Phytol
 Isophytol

References

Triols
Fatty alcohols